Mabuya maculata may refer to:

 Mabuya maculata (Demerara), a Guyanese skink
 Mabuya maculata (Fernando de Noronha), a Brazilian skink

maculata